Sojourn may refer to:

Books and periodicals
Sojourn (comics), a CrossGen comic book series
Sojourn (journal), a journal of social and cultural issues in Southeast Asia
Sojourn (novel), the 1991 novel in the Dark Elf Trilogy by R. A. Salvatore
The Sojourn, a 2011 novel by Andrew Krivak

Music
Sojourn (album), a 1977 album by Mickey Tucker
"Sojourn", a song by Natasha Bedingfield from Unwritten
Sojourn Music, an American Christian music group

Other uses
"Sojourn" (American Horror Story), a television episode
Sojourn, a predecessor of TorilMUD, a text-based online role-playing game
Sevoflurane, trade name Sojourn, an inhalational anaesthetic
Sojourn Shelton (born 1994), American football player

See also
Sojourner (disambiguation)